The Funeral Orchestra (often abbreviated to TFO) is a funeral doom band from Sweden.

History
The Funeral Orchestra's debut studio album, Feeding the Abyss, was released on 30 June 2003, via Aftermath Music. In January 2006, the band was announced to have signed a new deal with Aftermath Music, before releasing Slow Shalt Be the Whole of the Law (demo 2002 re-issue on CD); said album was released on 6 June 2006. In July 2009, the band's first music video, "Opium de Occulta" off their 2008 EP ODO, was released.

In summer 2010, Aftermath Music released a split album between The Funeral Orchestra and Ocean Chief, titled The Northern Lights II.

In 2020, the band released their second album, Negative Evocation Rites, via NWN! Productions (vinyl LP) and Nirucon Productions (cassette tape).

Band members
Current
Priest I – vocals, guitar (2002–present)
Priest II – bass (2019–present), guitar (2003)
Priest III – percussion (2019–present)

Former
Priest x – bass (2003)
Priest x – drums, percussion (2003–2019)

Discography
SSBTWOTL Demo 2002 (demo, 2002)
We Are the End (demo, 2003)
Feeding the Abyss (full-length, 2003, Aftermath Music)
Slow Shalt Be the Whole of the Law (demo 2002 reissue on CD, 2006, Aftermath Music)
ODO (EP, 2008, Aftermath Music)
Northern Lights II (split with Ocean Chief, 2010, Aftermath Music)
Korp (split with In Mourning, Djevel, Kari Rueslåtten and Amtimatter
Apocalyptic Plague Ritual MMXX (full-length, 2020, self-released)
Negative Evocations - (The EP) (EP, 2020, self-released)
Negative Evocation Rites (full-length, 2020, NWN! Productions, Nirucon Productions)

References

External links
The Funeral Orchestra official website
The Funeral Orchestra at Bandcamp

Musical groups established in 2002
Swedish doom metal musical groups
2002 establishments in Sweden
Funeral doom musical groups